De Ven is a lighthouse in Oosterdijk, a village in the municipality of Enkhuizen, Netherlands. Built in 1699–1700, it is one of the oldest lighthouses in the Netherlands.

History
De Ven was one of the three lighthouses indicating the route from the Waddenzee to Amsterdam; the other two were at Marken and Durgerdam. De Ven is the only one remaining of the three original lighthouses.

In 1819 the lighthouse burned down, with only the outer walls still standing. An emergency solution functioned for twenty years. In 1834, the light was equipped with a Fresnel lens. For years, a second tower next to the lighthouse passed on information to passing ships about wind and weather. Since 1966 the lighthouse is a Rijksmonument.

The light was extinguished on 16 April 2009 since the light characteristic no longer properly marked the shipping route to Lemmer. After protests the light was reinstated with a different characteristic, on 21 October 2009. The lighthouse is not open to the public.

See also

 List of lighthouses in the Netherlands

References

External links
 Information on haringstad.com
 Information on Nederlandse Vuurtorens
 Information on www.hollandfocus.com

Lighthouses completed in 1700
Towers completed in 1700
Lighthouses in North Holland
Rijksmonuments in North Holland
1700 establishments in the Dutch Republic
Buildings and structures in Enkhuizen
18th-century architecture in the Netherlands